Modugno is an Italian language surname. It is likely a toponymic surname derived from the Italian town of Modugno. People with the name include:

 Domenico Modugno (1928–1994), Italian singer, songwriter, actor, and politician
 Franco Modugno (born 1938), Italian law professor and judge
 Giuseppe Modugno (born 1960), Italian pianist
 Raffaella Modugno (born 1988), Italian model

Italian toponymic surnames